"Holiday" (stylized as "HOLIDAY") is a song recorded by Japanese singer Misia, from her fourth compilation album Super Best Records: 15th Celebration. It was released digitally as a promotional single by Ariola Japan on January 30, 2013. The song was written by Misia, composed by Kenji Hayashida and arranged by DJ Gomi.

Background and release
"Holiday" was released to digital download, exclusively on iTunes, on March 19, 2014, three weeks before the release of Super Best Records: 15th Celebration. The song was used in television commercials for the Toyota Isis, starting October 24, 2012. A music video for the song, starring Ema Fujisawa and Kensei Mikami, was written and directed by Ellie Omiya.

Chart performance
"Holiday" charted at number 51 on the Billboard Japan Adult Contemporary Airplay chart.

Charts

References

2014 songs
Misia songs
Songs written by Misia
Songs used as jingles